Utøykaia or Utøya-kaia, also called «Thorbjørnkaia», is a ferry landing in Tyrifjorden. The pier is located about 450 meters south of the pier at Utvika Camping. The sign "Utøya" on the main road points to Utøykaia.
 
MS Thorbjørn is normally moored at the pier. During the Labour Youth League's annual summer camp, the vessel shuttles between Utøya and Utøykaia.

It was from here Anders Behring Breivik dressed in a police uniform got over to the Island during the 2011 Norway attacks.

Gallery

References

2011 Norway attacks
Hole, Norway
Ferry quays in Viken